Doris Breamer Hare MBE (1 March 1905 – 30 May 2000) was a British actress, comedian, singer, and dancer best known for portraying Mabel Butler in the British sitcom On the Buses and its film spin-offs, after replacing the original actress Cicely Courtneidge.

Biography
Hare was born in Bargoed, Glamorgan. Her parents had a portable theatre in South Wales and it seemed inevitable that she would become a part of it, making her debut at the age of three in Current Cash and appearing in juvenile troupes all over Britain as a child, before going solo as 'Little Doris Hare', appearing in music hall, variety, cabaret, revues and pantomimes. One of five, her brother, Bertie Hare and her sisters Betty Hare and Winifred Hare Braemer were also actors and performers

In 1930, the actress toured in The Show's the Thing, taking the part previously performed by Gracie Fields. In 1932 she appeared in the West End in Noël Coward's show Words and Music, alongside John Mills. In 1936, she made her Broadway debut in Night Must Fall. During the war she joined Evelyn Laye to put on a revue for the troops and compered Shipmates Ashore on the BBC Forces Programme for the Merchant Navy. She was subsequently appointed Member of the Order of the British Empire (MBE) in the 1946 Birthday Honours "for services to the Merchant Navy."

In 1958, she created the role of Grannie Tooke in the original production of Sandy Wilson's musical version of Valmouth at the Lyric Hammersmith. She also performed on the recording of this production made by Pye Records in 1959, where she duetted with Cleo Laine, who was standing in for Bertice Reading. In 1982, when this musical was revived by John Dexter at Chichester Festival Theatre, Doris Hare, Bertice Reading, Fenella Fielding and Marcia Ashton all played the roles they had played in the original production.

In 1963, she joined the Royal Shakespeare Company and in 1965 joined the National Theatre Company at the Old Vic. She acted in plays by Shakespeare, Shaw, Pinero, and Pinter.

She was offered the role of Ena Sharples an original in serial Coronation Street in 1960, she turned the role down and instead it was given to Violet Carson, Hare did however play a smaller role  in the series in 1969 as Alice Pickens, who was due to marry Albert Tatlock, but the wedding never took place.

That same year Hare came to national attention in the role of Mrs Butler in On the Buses, taking over the part from Cicely Courtneidge in the second series of the ITV comedy. The series ran until 1973 and spawned three spin-off films On the Buses (1971), Mutiny on the Buses (1972) and Holiday on the Buses (1973) in which Hare reprised her small-screen role. The cast also performed a stage version of the series in Vancouver, British Columbia, Canada, in 1988.

In 1974, Hare spent a year in the West End farce No Sex Please, We're British and made her final stage appearance, aged 87, at the London Palladium alongside John Mills in a tribute to Evelyn Laye.

Hare won a Variety Club of Great Britain Special Award for her contributions to show business in 1982. She died at Denville Hall the actors retirement home in Northwood, London in 2000, aged 95.

Filmography

References

External links 
 
 A Video clip of Doris Hare on her 

1905 births
2000 deaths
Members of the Order of the British Empire
British television actresses
British film actresses
Royal Shakespeare Company members
People from Bargoed
People from Northwood, London
20th-century British actresses
20th-century British businesspeople